Angela L. Perun (March 14, 1921 – November 17, 2007) was an American politician who served in the New Jersey General Assembly from the 17th Legislative District from 1982 to 1986.

References

1921 births
2007 deaths
20th-century American politicians
20th-century American women politicians
Democratic Party members of the New Jersey General Assembly
Republican Party members of the New Jersey General Assembly
Politicians from Plainfield, New Jersey
Women state legislators in New Jersey
21st-century American women